Tân Thạnh  is a town (thị trấn) and capital of Tân Thạnh District, Long An Province, in south-western Vietnam.

References

Populated places in Long An province
Communes of Long An province
District capitals in Vietnam
Townships in Vietnam